Semaxanib  (SU5416) is a tyrosine-kinase inhibitor drug designed by SUGEN as a cancer therapeutic. It is an experimental stage drug, not licensed for use on human patients outside clinical trials.
Semaxanib is a potent and selective synthetic inhibitor of the Flk-1/KDR vascular endothelial growth factor (VEGF) receptor tyrosine kinase. It targets the VEGF pathway, and both in vivo and in vitro studies have demonstrated antiangiogenic potential.

In February 2002, Pharmacia, the then-parent of Sugen, prematurely ended Phase III clinical trials of semaxinib in the treatment of advanced colorectal cancer due to discouraging results. Other studies, at earlier phases, have since been conducted. However, due to the prospect of next-generation tyrosine kinase inhibitors and the inefficacy of semaxanib in clinic trials, further development of the drug has been discontinued. A related compound, SU11248 was further developed by Sugen, and then by Pfizer and was FDA-approved as sunitinib (Sutent) for treatment of renal carcinoma in January 2006.

References 

Receptor tyrosine kinase inhibitors
Experimental cancer drugs
Indolines
Lactams
Pyrroles
Oxindoles